Conghalach Cnoghbha (older spelling: Congalach Cnogba or Congalach mac Máel Mithig) was High King of Ireland, according to the lists in the Annals of the Four Masters, from around 944 to 956. Congalach is one of the twelve "kings of Ireland" listed in the hand of the original scribe of the Annals of Ulster.

A member of the Síl nÁedo Sláine Kings of Brega, a branch of the southern Uí Néill, Congalach was a descendant in the tenth generation of Áed Sláine, which was presented as the basis for his kingship. Maternally, Congalach was a member of Clann Cholmáin, the dominant branch of the southern Uí Néill, a grandson of Flann Sinna and sister's son of his predecessor as High King Donnchad Donn. The Annals of Innisfallen, rather than having Congalach as sole High King, associate him with his frequent enemy Ruaidrí ua Canannáin of the Cenél Conaill.

The Irish annals record Congalach at war with most of his neighbours, variously ally and enemy of the Norse-Gael king of Dublin Amlaíb Cuarán. Congalach eventually met his death fighting the Laigin and the Norse-Gaels of Dublin in 956, in an ambush at Dún Ailinne (County Kildare).

Notes

References

 Byrne, Francis J., Irish Kings and High-Kings. B.T. Batsford, London, 1973. 
 McCarthy, Dan, "The Chronology of the Irish Annals" in Proceedings of the Royal Irish Academy, 1998, pp. 203–255 (pdf). 
 Woolf, Alex, "Pictish Matriliny Reconsidered" in The Innes Review, volume XLIX, no. 2 (Autumn 1998), pp. 147–167. ISSN 0020-157X

External links
CELT: Corpus of Electronic Texts at University College Cork. The Corpus of Electronic Texts includes the Annals of Ulster and the Four Masters, the Chronicon Scotorum and the Book of Leinster as well as Genealogies, and various Saints' Lives. Most are translated into English, or translations are in progress
Revised edition of McCarthy's synchronisms at Trinity College Dublin.

 

956 deaths
People from County Meath
10th-century High Kings of Ireland
Year of birth unknown